Pac-Man Games was an iOS application by Namco Bandai Games that contained timed "S" (Score Attack) versions of six different Namco games, with the games being Pac-Man S, Dig Dug S, Galaga S, Rally-X S, Gator Panic S, and Pac-Chain S. The game also came with a "My Room" mode where the player could dress up their avatar and decorate their room. Points earned from the games could be used to purchase items for the avatar and the avatar's room. The application was also linked to Facebook. It was available from 29 March 2012 to 30 March 2014.

See also
 Namco Arcade
 Galaga 30th Collection
List of Namco retro video game compilations

Pac-Man
2012 video games
IOS games
IOS-only games
Bandai Namco video game compilations
Products and services discontinued in 2014
Video games developed in Japan
Delisted digital-only games